The Daihatsu Luxio is a minivan designed by Daihatsu and manufactured by Astra Daihatsu Motor in Indonesia. It was launched on 26 February 2009. Based on the Gran Max, Luxio is intended to be the upmarket passenger van version of it. It has a slightly wider body and is taller and cosmetically different from the Gran Max. The Luxio received a facelift on 19 February 2014.

The Luxio is offered in D, M and X trim levels. The M trim was discontinued with the launch of the facelifted model.

Powertrain 
The engine is paired with either a 5-speed manual or a 4-speed automatic gearbox. The latter is only offered on the X trim.

Safety 
The two front passengers and outer two passengers for both middle and third row seats have a 3-point seatbelt while the centre passengers for both middle and third row seats have a 2-point one. The Luxio lacks airbags. The optional anti-lock braking system was offered for the pre-facelift model (in M and X trims), but later abolished in the facelift model due to lack of demand.

Gallery 
Pre-facelift

Facelift

Sales

References

External links 

 

Luxio
Cars introduced in 2009
2010s cars
2020s cars
Minivans
Rear-wheel-drive vehicles